The 1971 Redwood Bank Pacific Coast Open – Singles was an event of the 1971 Redwood Bank Pacific Coast Open men's tennis tournament and was played on outdoor hard courts at the Berkeley Tennis Club in Berkeley, California in the United States between September 27 and October 3, 1971. The draw comprised 64 players and eight players were seeded. Arthur Ashe was the defending singles champion but lost in the semifinals. First-seeded Rod Laver won the title by defeating fourth-seeded Ken Rosewall in the final, 6–4, 6–4, 7–6.

Seeds

Draw

Finals

Top half

Section 1

Section 2

Bottom half

Section 3

Section 4

References

External links
 ITF tournament edition details

Tennis in California